Lawrence Ah Mon or Lawrence Lau Kwok Cheong (劉國昌) (born 1949) is a Hong Kong film director. His films are notable for their lurid exploration of the problems of the poor in modern Hong Kong, such as Gangs (1986), Spacked Out (2000), Gimme Gimme (2001) and City Without Baseball (2008). He has also made several films about colonial and postcolonial subaltern history in Hong Kong, such as the Lee Rock series (starring Andy Lau) and Queen of Temple Street (1990).

He was born in Pretoria, South Africa.

He has been nominated for Best Director in the Hong Kong Film Awards twice.

Filmography as director
 Dealer/Healer (2017)
 Tales from the Dark 2 (2013)
 Tactical Unit - No Way Out (2009)
 Besieged City (2008)
 City Without Baseball (2008)
 My Name is Fame (2006)
 Gimme Gimme (2001)
 Spacked Out (2000)
 One and a Half (1995)
 Even Mountains Meet (1993)
 Three Summers (1992)
 Arrest the Restless (1992)
 Gangs '92 (1992)
 Lee Rock III (1992)
 Dreams of Glory: A Boxer's Story (1991)
 Lee Rock II (1991)
 Lee Rock (1991)
 Queen of Temple Street (1990)
 Gangs (1988)

External links

 HK Cinemagic entry

Hong Kong film directors
1949 births
Living people
Hong Kong people of Shun Tak descent
South African emigrants to Hong Kong